William Cavendish, 2nd Duke of Devonshire  (1672 – 4 June 1729) was a British nobleman and politician. He was the eldest son of William Cavendish, 1st Duke of Devonshire and Lady Mary Butler. A prominent Whig, he was sworn of the Privy Council in 1707, and served as Lord President of the Council from 1716 to 1718 and 1725 to 1729. 

He married The Hon. Rachel Russell (1674–1725), daughter of William Russell, Lord Russell on 21 June 1688. The Duchess served as a Lady of the Bedchamber at the court of Queen Anne. 

They had ten children:
 Lady Mary Cavendish (18 August 1696 – 15 June 1719) 
William Cavendish, 3rd Duke of Devonshire (26 September 1698 – 5 December 1755)
Lady Rachel Cavendish (4 October 1699 – 18 June 1780)  married Sir William Morgan on 14 May 1723
Lady Elizabeth Cavendish (27 September 1700 – 7 November 1747) married Sir Thomas Lowther, 2nd Baronet
Lord James Cavendish (23 November 1701 – 14 December 1741)
Lord Charles Cavendish (17 March 1704 – 28 April 1783) married Anne Grey on 9 January 1727, father of Henry Cavendish
 Lady Anne Cavendish (died 23 August 1780 aged 70)
 Lady Katherine Cavendish (died 12 September 1715 aged 9) 
 Lord John Cavendish (died 11 May 1720 aged 12)
 Lady Diana Cavendish (died 12 February 1722)

References 

1672 births
1729 deaths
102
William Cavendish, 02nd Duke of Devonshire
Garter Knights appointed by Anne
Lord-Lieutenants of Derbyshire
Lord Presidents of the Council
Members of the Privy Council of Great Britain
English MPs 1695–1698
English MPs 1698–1700
English MPs 1701
English MPs 1701–1702
English MPs 1702–1705
English MPs 1705–1707
Members of the Kit-Kat Club
People from Derbyshire